Lally Cove was a settlement located north of Belleoram. The Way Office was established in 1886. The first Waymaster was Stephen Gould. The settlement was depopulated in 1966. It had a population of 49 in 1940, and 66 in 1956. This settlement was located near Fortune Bay and was settled in modern-day Newfoundland and Labrador, Canada.

See also
 List of communities in Newfoundland and Labrador

Ghost towns in Newfoundland and Labrador